Sarcochilus australis, commonly known as the butterfly orchid or Gunn's tree orchid, is a small epiphytic orchid endemic to eastern Australia. It has up to ten oblong, dark green leaves and up to fourteen small green to yellowish or brownish flowers with a mostly white labellum.

Description
The side lobes are erect, usually with purple markings and the middle lobe erect with a thin, solid spur. Flowering occurs between October and January.

Taxonomy and naming
The butterfly orchid was first formally described in 1834 by John Lindley who gave it the name Gunnia australis and published the description in Edwards's Botanical Register. In 1863, Heinrich Gustav Reichenbach changed the name to Sarcochilus australis. The specific epithet (australis) is a Latin word meaning "southern".

Distribution and habitat
Sarcochilus australis grows on trees in rainforest and other humid places, sometimes close to the ground. It is found between the Hunter River in New South Wales through south-eastern Victoria to northern Tasmania.

References

Endemic orchids of Australia
Orchids of New South Wales
Orchids of Victoria (Australia)
Orchids of Tasmania
Plants described in 1834
australis